Cassius & Adelia Baker House is a historic house in Wamego, Kansas, U.S.. It was built in 1910. It was designed in the American Craftsman architectural style. It has been listed on the National Register of Historic Places since June 25, 2013.

References

Buildings and structures in Pottawatomie County, Kansas
Houses completed in 1910
Houses on the National Register of Historic Places in Kansas
American Craftsman architecture in Kansas
Bungalow architecture in Kansas